The Big South Conference is a collegiate athletic conference affiliated with the NCAA's Division I. Originally a non-football conference, the Big South began sponsoring football in 2002 as part of the Football Championship Subdivision (FCS). The Big South, founded in 1983, is firmly rooted in the South Atlantic region of the United States, with full member institutions located in North Carolina, South Carolina, and Virginia. Associate members are located in Georgia, North Carolina, Pennsylvania, Rhode Island, and South Carolina.

History

Charter members included Armstrong State (later Armstrong Atlantic State University and now merged into Georgia Southern University as its Armstrong Campus) (1983–1987), Augusta (later Augusta State University and now merged into Augusta University) (1983–1990), Campbell University (1983–1994; 2011–present), Baptist College (now Charleston Southern University) (1983–present), Coastal Carolina University (1983–2016), Radford University (1983–present) and Winthrop University (1983–present).

The expansion of membership occurred during the 1980s and '90s. Some of those members are the University of North Carolina at Asheville (1984–present), Davidson College (1990–1992), Liberty University (1991–2018), the University of Maryland, Baltimore County (1992–1998), the University of North Carolina at Greensboro (1992–1997), Towson University (1992–1995), Elon University (1999–2003), High Point University (1999–present) and Birmingham–Southern College (2000–2006).

The Big South Conference began sponsoring football in 2002, with Charleston Southern, Elon (at the time) and Liberty (Gardner–Webb University also joined as a football-only member) fielding teams; Coastal Carolina and Virginia Military Institute (VMI) joined the conference as football-only members in 2003. In that same athletic year, VMI also joined the conference for all sports, but left to re-join the Southern Conference in 2014. Presbyterian College joined the conference in 2007, moving up from Division II, and became eligible for regular-season championships and conference honors during the 2008–09 athletic year. Gardner–Webb, which had been a football-only member since 2002, joined the conference for all sports on July 1, 2008. Campbell rejoined the Big South for all sports except football in the 2011–12 athletic year. Longwood University accepted an invitation to join the Big South on January 23, 2012, and membership formally began July 1 of that year; Longwood had been independent since 2004, during their transition to Division I. In 2014, following the departure of VMI, the conference returned to a single-division structure. On September 1, 2015, Coastal Carolina announced they would leave the conference following the 2015–16 school year to transition to FBS-level football and the Sun Belt Conference. On June 30, 2016, the day before the school joined the Sun Belt, Coastal Carolina won the 2016 College World Series in baseball. This was the first time in conference history that a team won an NCAA championship in any sport.

In September 2016, the Big South and the ASUN Conference (ASUN) announced a football partnership that effectively combined the two conferences in that sport. Under its terms, any members of either conference that add or upgrade to scholarship football, provided they fall within the current geographic footprint of the two leagues, automatically join Big South football. At the time of announcement, the only ASUN member that played scholarship football, Kennesaw State, was already a Big South football member. The partnership also provides a guaranteed football home to the leagues' non-scholarship football programs (at that time, Campbell from the Big South, and Jacksonville and Stetson from the ASUN) should they upgrade to scholarship status.

In November 2016, Campbell announced that it would begin offering scholarships and move its football program from the Pioneer Football League to the Big South in 2018.

In December 2016, the University of North Alabama, ASUN, and the Big South Conference announced that, effective in 2018, the school will leave the Division II Gulf South Conference and will join ASUN in non-football sports and the Big South in football. UNA has won three Division II NCAA national championships in football and has won at least a share of the Gulf South Conference football championship for four consecutive seasons through 2016.

Three months later, Liberty announced that it would begin a transition to FBS football in July 2017 and leave the Big South football league in 2018. Liberty and the Big South agreed later in 2017 that the school would continue to house all of its non-football sports (except for field hockey and women's swimming, neither of which is sponsored by the Big South) in that conference for the immediate future. Once Liberty became a full FBS member at the start of the 2019–20 school year, it would have technically become a Big South associate member (barring the school joining an FBS conference). However, Liberty's plans would change several months later, as it instead announced in May 2018 that it would move its non-football sports to the ASUN effective that July (except for the aforementioned field hockey and women's swimming, also not sponsored by the ASUN).

In November 2017, the University of South Carolina Upstate and Hampton University announced that they would be leaving the ASUN and Mid-Eastern Athletic Conference, respectively, to join the Big South, starting in the fall of 2018.

On November 19, 2017, Presbyterian College announced it would be moving its football program to the non-scholarship Pioneer Football League. Presbyterian's last Big South football season was in 2019; the Blue Hose planned to play the 2020 season as an independent before joining the Pioneer League for 2021 and beyond. The Blue Hose remain a member of the Big South in all other sports.

A more recent change to its core membership was the July 2021 arrival of North Carolina A&T State University from the MEAC as a full member, including football. At the same time, Robert Morris University was planned to join as a football-only member. North Carolina A&T joined on the originally planned schedule, but Robert Morris became a Big South football member in November 2020. COVID-19 led the conference to move its 2020 football season to spring 2021. Since two of the eight Big South football members (apart from RMU) chose to play in the originally scheduled fall 2020 season and a third chose not to play football at all in 2020–21, the Big South chose to bring the Colonials into the football league for spring 2021.

More recently, the Big South added three new single-sport members in women's lacrosse effective with the 2022 season (2021–22 school year): Furman University, Mercer University, and Wofford College. All three are full members of the Southern Conference (SoCon), which disbanded its women's lacrosse league after the 2021 season.

On January 25, 2022, the Colonial Athletic Association announced that Hampton University would join that conference, as well as CAA Football, its technically separate football league, on July 1, 2022. On February 22, that conference announced that North Carolina A&T State University would be leaving the Big South, joining the all-sports CAA on July 1. North Carolina A&T would play Big South football in 2022 and join CAA Football on July 1, 2023.

Also on February 22, the conference announced its intent to combine its football membership with the Ohio Valley Conference beginning in 2023. The following month saw Bryant University announced as a new football-only member effective with the 2022 season. Campbell announced on August 3 that it will join both sides of the CAA in 2023 as well.

Member schools

Current full members

Notes

Current associate members

Notes

Former members

Notes

Former associate members

Notes

Membership timeline

 Augusta State was merged into Georgia Regents University in January 2013; the merged school renamed itself Augusta University in 2015.

Sports

Men's sponsored sports by school
Departing member in pink.

Notes

Men's varsity sports not sponsored by the Big South Conference which are played by Big South schools:

Notes

In addition to the above, Campbell counts both its male and female cheerleaders as varsity athletes.

Women's sponsored sports by school

Women's varsity sports not sponsored by the Big South Conference which are played by Big South schools:

Notes

In addition to the above, Campbell, Gardner–Webb, and Presbyterian consider their female cheerleaders to be varsity athletes, with Campbell also considering its male cheerleaders as such.

Football – players drafted to the NFL
The Big South has had a number of players to get drafted and play football professionally in the NFL.

Conference champions

Men's basketball

Basketball Tournament Championships by school 

†Former member of the Big South

Football

Women's basketball

Men's Soccer

Broadcasters (Big South Network)

In addition to basketball games being broadcast on regional and national television, member schools of the Big South Conference are required to provide a live stream of all home games for all sports when playing teams both within and outside the conference. These streams are run by the university hosting the event. All streams are featured on the conference website and are available for free. The football games broadcast on the web are branded as part of a Big South Network.

National Champions

Facilities
Departing member in pink.

Notes

See also
List of American collegiate athletic stadiums and arenas

References

External links

 
Organizations based in Charlotte, North Carolina
Sports in the Eastern United States
Sports in the Southern United States
Sports organizations established in 1983
Articles which contain graphical timelines
1983 establishments in the United States